Makihiro Motomiya (born 31 December 1968) is a Japanese water polo coach. He was the head coach of the Japan women's national water polo team at the 2020 Summer Olympics.

References

External links
 

1968 births
Living people
Japanese male water polo players
Japanese water polo coaches
Japan women's national water polo team coaches
Water polo coaches at the 2020 Summer Olympics
20th-century Japanese people
21st-century Japanese people
Medalists at the 1990 Asian Games
Water polo players at the 1990 Asian Games
Asian Games medalists in water polo
Asian Games silver medalists for Japan